The Man of Forty Crowns is a fable written by Voltaire.

External links 

 The Man of Forty Crowns at Google Books

Fables
Works by Voltaire